James Edward Ulland (born June 30, 1942) is an American politician in the state of Minnesota. He served in the Minnesota House of Representatives and Minnesota Senate. He served as Minnesota Senate Minority Leader from 1983 to 1985.

References

1942 births
Living people
Republican Party members of the Minnesota House of Representatives
Republican Party Minnesota state senators